fa:عیب فنی
A glitch is a short-lived fault in a system, such as a transient fault that corrects itself, making it difficult to troubleshoot. The term is particularly common in the computing and electronics industries, in circuit bending, as well as among players of video games. More generally, all types of systems including human organizations and nature experience glitches.

A glitch, which is slight and often temporary, differs from a more serious bug which is a genuine functionality-breaking problem. Alex Pieschel, writing for Arcade Review, said: bug' is often cast as the weightier and more blameworthy pejorative, while 'glitch' suggests something more mysterious and unknowable inflicted by surprise inputs or stuff outside the realm of code."

Etymology
Some reference books, including Random House's American Slang, claim that the term comes from the German word glitschen ("to slip") and the Yiddish word glitshn ("to slide",  "to skid"). Either way, it is a relatively new term.  It was first widely defined for the American people by Bennett Cerf on the June 20, 1965, episode of What's My Line as "a kink ... when anything goes wrong down there [Cape Kennedy], they say there's been a slight glitch." Astronaut John Glenn explained the term in his section of the book Into Orbit, writing that
Another term we adopted to describe some of our problems was "glitch." Literally, a glitch is a spike or change in voltage in an electrical circuit which takes place when the circuit suddenly has a new load put on it. You have probably noticed a dimming of lights in your home when you turn a switch or start the dryer or the television set. Normally, these changes in voltage are protected by fuses. A glitch, however, is such a minute change in voltage that no fuse could protect against it.
John Daily further defined the word on the July 4, 1965, episode of the same show, saying that it's a term used by the Air Force at Cape Kennedy, in the process of launching rockets, "it means something's gone wrong and you can't figure out what it is so you call it a 'glitch'."  Later, on July 23, 1965, Time magazine felt it necessary to define it in an article: "Glitches—a spaceman's word for irritating disturbances." In relation to the reference by Time, the term has been believed to enter common usage during the American Space Race of the 1950s, where it was used to describe minor faults in the rocket hardware that were difficult to pinpoint.
According to a Wall Street Journal article written by Ben Zimmer, Yale law librarian Fred Shapiro came up with the new earliest use of the word yet found: May 19, 1940. That was when the novelist Katharine Brush wrote about glitch in her column "Out of My Mind" (syndicated in The Washington Post, The Boston Globe, and other papers). Brush corroborated Tony Randall's radio recollection:When the radio talkers make a little mistake in diction they call it a "fluff," and when they make a bad one they call it a "glitch," and I love it.Other examples from the world of radio can be found in the 1940s. The April 11, 1943, issue of The Washington Post carried a review of Helen Sioussat's book about radio broadcasting, Mikes Don't Bite. The reviewer noted an error and wrote, "In the lingo of radio, has Miss Sioussat pulled a 'muff,' 'fluff,' 'bust,' or 'glitch'?" And in a 1948 book called The Advertising and Business Side of Radio, Ned Midgley explained how a radio station's "traffic department" was responsible for properly scheduling items in a broadcast. "Usually most 'glitches,' as on-the-air mistakes are called, can be traced to a mistake on the part of the traffic department", Midgley wrote.

Further digging reveals that in the 1950s, glitch made the transition from radio to television. In a 1953 ad in Broadcasting magazine, RCA boasted that their TV camera has "no more a-c power line 'glitches' (horizontal-bar interference)." And Bell Telephone ran an ad in a 1955 issue of Billboard showing two technicians monitoring the TV signals that were broadcast on Bell System lines: "When he talks of 'glitch' with a fellow technician, he means a low frequency interference which appears as a narrow horizontal bar moving vertically through the picture."

A 1959 article in Sponsor, a trade magazine for television and radio advertisers, gave another technical usage in an article about editing TV commercials by splicing tape. "'Glitch' is slang for the 'momentary jiggle' that occurs at the editing point if the sync pulses don't match exactly in the splice." It also provided one of the earliest etymologies of the word, noting that, "'Glitch' probably comes from a German or Yiddish word meaning a slide, a glide or a slip."

Electronics glitch
An electronics glitch or logic hazard is a transition that occurs on a signal before the signal settles to its intended value, particularly in a digital circuit. Generally, this implies an electrical pulse of short duration, often due to a race condition between two signals derived from a common source but with different delays.  In some cases, such as a well-timed synchronous circuit, this could be a harmless and well-tolerated effect that occurs normally in a design. In other contexts, a glitch can represent an undesirable result of a fault or design error that can produce a malfunction.  Some electronic components, such as flip-flops, are triggered by a pulse that must not be shorter than a specified minimum duration in order to function correctly; a pulse shorter than the specified minimum may be called a glitch. A related concept is the runt pulse, a pulse whose amplitude is smaller than the minimum level specified for correct operation, and a spike, a short pulse similar to a glitch but often caused by ringing or crosstalk.

Computer glitch
A computer glitch is the failure of a system, usually containing a computing device, to complete its functions or to perform them properly. It frequently refers to an error which is not detected at the time it occurs but shows up later in data errors or incorrect human decisions. Situations which are frequently called computer glitches are incorrectly written software (software bugs), incorrect instructions given by the operator (operator errors, and a failure to account for this possibility might also be considered a software bug), undetected invalid input data (this might also be considered a software bug), undetected communications errors, computer viruses, Trojan attacks and computer exploiting (sometimes called "hacking").

Such glitches could produce problems such as keyboard malfunction, number key failures, screen abnormalities (turned left, right or upside-down), random program malfunctions, and abnormal program registering.

Examples of computer glitches causing disruption include an unexpected shutdown of a water filtration plant in New Canaan, 2010, failures in the Computer Aided Dispatch system used by the police in Austin, resulting in unresponded 911 calls, and an unexpected bit flip causing the Cassini spacecraft to enter "safe mode" in November 2010. Glitches can also be costly: in 2015, a bank was unable to raise interest rates for weeks resulting in losses of more than a million dollars per day.

Video game glitches

Glitches in video games can affect different aspects of a game:
Texture or model glitches are a kind of bug or other error that causes any specific model or texture to either become distorted or otherwise to not look as intended by the developers. Bethesda's The Elder Scrolls V: Skyrim is notorious for texture glitches, as well as other errors that affect many of the company's popular titles. Many games that use ragdoll physics for their character models can have such glitches happen to them.
Physics glitches are errors in a game's physics engine that causes a specific entity, be it a physics object or a non-player character, to be unintentionally moved to some degree. These kinds of errors can be exploited, unlike many. The chance of a physics error happening can either be entirely random or accidentally caused, such as a bug in the notoriously developed 2006 Sonic the Hedgehog reboot that can launch the player character a significant distance when coming into contact with a particular crate in a particular way.
Sound glitches prevent sounds from playing properly in some way. These can range from sounds playing when not intended to play or even not playing at all. Occasionally, a certain sound will loop or otherwise the player will be given the option to continuously play the sound when not intended. Often, games will play sounds incorrectly due to corrupt data altering the values predefined in the code. Examples include, but are not limited to, extremely high or low pitched sounds, volume being mute or too high to understand, and also rarely even playing in reverse order/playing reversed.

Glitches may include incorrectly displayed graphics, collision detection errors, game freezes/crashes, sound errors, and other issues. Graphical glitches are especially notorious in platforming games, where malformed textures can directly affect gameplay (for example, by displaying a ground texture where the code calls for an area that should damage the character, or by not displaying a wall texture where there should be one, resulting in an invisible wall). Some glitches are potentially dangerous to the game's stored data, such as MissingNo. from the Pokémon games.

"Glitching" is the practice of players exploiting faults in a video game's programming to achieve tasks that give them an unfair advantage in the game, over NPC's or other players, such as running through walls or defying the game's physics. Glitches can be deliberately induced in certain home video game consoles by manipulating the game medium, such as tilting a ROM cartridge to disconnect one or more connections along the edge connector and interrupt part of the flow of data between the cartridge and the console. This can result in graphic, music, or gameplay errors.  Doing this, however, carries the risk of crashing the game or even causing permanent damage to the game medium.

Heavy use of glitches are often used in performing a speedrun of a video game. One type of glitch often used for speedrunning is a stack overflow, which is referred to as "overflowing". Another type of speedrunning glitch, which is almost impossible to do by humans and is mostly made use of in tool assisted speedruns, is arbitrary code execution which will cause an object in a game to do something outside of its intended function.

Part of the quality assurance process (as performed by game testers for video games) is locating and reproducing glitches, and then compiling reports on the glitches to be fed back to the programmers so that they can repair the bugs. Certain games have a cloud-type system for updates to the software that can be used to repair coding faults and other errors in the games.

Some games purposely include effects that look like glitches as a means to break the fourth wall and either scare the player or put the player at unease, or otherwise as part of the game's narrative. Games like Eternal Darkness and Batman: Arkham Asylum include segments with intentional glitches where it appears that the player's game system has failed. The Animus interface in the Assassin's Creed series, which allows the player-character to experience the memories of an ancestor though their generic heritage, includes occasional glitches as to enforce the idea that the game is what the player-character is witnessing through a computer-aided system. Five Nights at Freddys: Help Wanted for mobile has 'glitches' that you need to tap on to unlock a minigame.

Glitches can also be found in electronic toys. For example, in 2013, Hasbro released a game called Bop It Beats. It was discovered by several players that the DJ Expert and Lights Only modes have a bug that will give players a fail sound upon reaching a pattern with six actions and completing them successfully. The more difficult DJ modes can be completed in the Party mode as long as there is a "Pass It" on the last few patterns. Hasbro was informed about this glitch but as it was discovered after manufacture, they can no longer update or upgrade existing units. Foreign versions of the game, however, were shipped with this glitch already patched.

Glitches in games should not be confused with exploits. Despite them both performing unintended actions, an exploit is not a programming error, but instead an oversight by the developers. (e.g. bunny hopping, repeatedly mashing a jump button to bypass movement limitations in the 2006 Sonic the Hedgehog reboot or taking advantage of opponents during lag in online multiplayer games)

Television glitch
In broadcasting, a corrupted signal may glitch in the form of jagged lines on the screen, misplaced squares, static looking effects, freezing problems, or inverted colors. The glitches may affect the video and/or audio (usually audio dropout) or the transmission. These glitches may be caused by a variety of issues, interference from portable electronics or microwaves, damaged cables at the broadcasting center, or weather.

In popular culture
Multiple works of popular culture deal with glitches; those with the word "glitch" or derivations thereof are detailed in Glitch (disambiguation).
The nonfiction book CB Bible (1976) includes glitch in its glossary of citizens band radio slang, defining it as "an indefinable technical defect in CB equipment", indicating the term was already then in use on citizens band. 
The short film The Glitch (2008), opening film and best science fiction finalist at Dragon Con Independent Film Festival 2008, deals with the disorientation of late-night TV viewer Harry Owen (Scott Charles Blamphin), who experiences "heavy brain-splitting digital breakdowns".

See also

 Fuzzing
 Glitch art
 Glitch removal
 Glitching
 Hazard (logic)
 Hardware bug
 Software bug

References

Digital electronics
Software bugs
Software anomalies
Computer errors